William "Bill" Bentsen (February 18, 1930 – December 25, 2020) was an American sailor and Olympic champion. Bentsen was born in Chicago, Illinois. He received a gold medal in the Soling class at the 1972 Summer Olympics in Munich. Bentsen was inducted into the National Sailing Hall of Fame in 2017.

References

External links
 
 

1930 births
2020 deaths
American male sailors (sport)
Olympic gold medalists for the United States in sailing
Olympic bronze medalists for the United States in sailing
Sailors at the 1964 Summer Olympics – Flying Dutchman
Sailors at the 1972 Summer Olympics – Soling
Medalists at the 1972 Summer Olympics
Medalists at the 1964 Summer Olympics